Carol Jane "Penny" Pence Taylor (born May 11, 1929), also known by her married name Penny Taylor, is an American former competition swimmer who represented the United States at the 1948 Summer Olympics in London.  She competed in the preliminary heats of the women's 200-meter breaststroke, and finished with a time of 3:28.1. Pence swam for the Lafayette Swim Club in Indiana and attended Purdue University. In 1951, when Pence was a finalist for the James E. Sullivan Award, she was part of the US Team for the first Pan American Games in 1951, winning a gold medal in the 3×100 meter medley relay and a bronze medal in the 200 meter breaststroke.

After retiring from competition, Pence became a professional swim coach in the St. Louis area for 35 years, with one of her students being five-time Olympic gold medalist Tom Jager. She served in many positions for USA Swimming, being team leader at the 1984 and 1992 Summer Olympics, deck marshal at the 1996 Olympics, and chef de mission in seven FINA World Championships.

References

1929 births
Living people
American female breaststroke swimmers
Olympic swimmers of the United States
Swimmers from Indianapolis
Swimmers at the 1948 Summer Olympics
Swimmers at the 1951 Pan American Games
Purdue University alumni
Pan American Games bronze medalists for the United States
Pan American Games medalists in swimming
Medalists at the 1951 Pan American Games
21st-century American women